Dysalotus alcocki is a species of deep sea fish, a swallower, from the family Chiasmodontidae which is found in the tropical and temperate oceans around the world. The adults fed mainly on fish. The generic name is derived from the Greek dysalotos which means "difficult to catch" and the specific name honours the English zoologist Alfred William Alcock (1859-1933).

References

Chiasmodontidae
Fish described in 1905